Anna Barbara Aemisegger-Giezendanner(29 May 1831 – 18 October 1905) was a Swiss painter and representative of the Appenzeller Bauernmalerei, a form of alpen folk art. She was colloquially known as «s’Giezedanners Babeli» and therefore is commonly known by the name Babeli Giezendanner.

Works 

 Alpaufzug (undated)
 Alpaufzug (1897)
 Alpfahrt (undated)
 Alpfahrt mit Bergwelt (undated)
 Alpfahrt und Sennerei (undated)
 Alpfahrt und Sennerei (undated)
 Alpfahrt und Toggenburgerhaus (undated)
 Bauernhaus Schneider mit Alpfahrt (undated)
 Die Alpfahrt (undated)
 Die Alpfahrt (undated)
 Die Alpfahrt (1887)
 Die Alpfahrt (1893)
 Im Aelpli (undated)
 Weidefahrt zur Läuis (undated)

References

1831 births
1905 deaths
19th-century Swiss painters
20th-century Swiss painters
Swiss women painters
20th-century Swiss women artists
19th-century Swiss women artists